Tura (Turu) is a rural locality (a settlement) and the administrative center of Evenkiysky District of Krasnoyarsk Krai, Russia, located in the Syverma Plateau, at the confluence of the Kochechum and the Nizhnyaya Tunguska Rivers. Population:

History
Tura was the administrative center of Evenk Autonomous Okrug before the okrug was merged into Krasnoyarsk Krai on January 1, 2007. Until April 2011, it had urban-type settlement status.

Transportation
Tura is served by the Tura Airport.  The town and airport are linked together by the A-383 road, though Tura is currently isolated from the Russian road and railway network.

Climate
Tura has a very cold subarctic climate (Köppen Dfc) with short, but warm and rainy summers with cool nights and long, bitterly cold winters with little sunshine.

References

External links
 History of Tura

Rural localities in Krasnoyarsk Krai
Road-inaccessible communities of Krasnoyarsk Krai
Evenkiysky District